National Route 379 is a national highway of Japan connecting Matsuyama, Ehime and Uchiko, Ehime in Japan, with a total length of 53.8 km (33.43 mi).

References

National highways in Japan
Roads in Ehime Prefecture